Tanskanen is a Finnish surname. Notable people with the surname include:

 Unto Tanskanen (born 1931), Finnish diplomat and lawyer
 Jani Tanskanen (born 1975), Finnish artistic gymnast
 Vilma Tanskanen (born 1995), Finnish ice hockey player

Finnish-language surnames